Dedham Vale is a designated Area of Outstanding Natural Beauty on the Essex-Suffolk border in east England. It comprises the area around the River Stour between Manningtree and Smallbridge Farm, 1 mile (1.6 km) east of Bures, including the village of Dedham in Essex.

It is part of the area known as Constable Country, as it was made famous by the paintings of the English Romantic painter John Constable. Among many other works of the area are his Dedham Vale paintings of 1802 and 1828, held in the Victoria and Albert Museum in London and the Scottish National Gallery in Edinburgh.

Land use
Dedham Vale supports a viable and diverse agriculture with a mix of farm sizes. The majority of the land in the valley is still farmed despite development pressures. Farming is the primary tool for supporting the area’s landscape and wildlife. Arger Fen, a Site of Special Scientific Interest, contains areas of ancient woodland, meadow and fen.

Geology
Throughout the valley Eocene and glacial deposits overlay chalk deposited during the Cretaceous period. London Clay and sands are often exposed on the valley sides as the river and its tributaries cut through the deposits. The composition of these layers and where they occur is paramount in determining what species will grow, which habitats can occur and how the area is farmed.

River
The River Stour is the key landscape focus for the valley, its course is defined by bank-side trees and wet meadows. It supports a variety of riparian (river) habitats.

The valley floor has a large areas of functioning floodplain. Water quality is good, meeting levels demanded in regulations. The catchment meets sustainable demands for water supply, flood control and recreational use, whilst retaining an unspoilt character and healthy ecosystem.

The river has become an important method of controlling water levels both in the surrounding countryside and irrigating crops.

Human influence

Humans have had a great influence on the landscape including building isolated settlements, transport links and churches. Agricultural workers divided up the land to plant crops, grow timber and graze animals.

The landscape continues to change as changing agricultural practices, increased leisure time and an awareness of environmental concerns all contribute to development of the Stour valley.

References

External links

 Dedham Vale AONB and Stour Valley Countryside Project 
 Dedham Vale Society
 Constable's England, a full text exhibition catalog from The Metropolitan Museum of Art, which contains material on Dedham Vale

Geography of Essex
Protected areas of Essex
Protected areas of Suffolk
John Constable